Thinking About You may refer to:

Music
 Thinkin' About You, a 1995 album by Trisha Yearwood
 Thinkin' About You, a 1998 album by Rita Coolidge

 "Thinking About You" (Elvis Presley song), 1975
 "Thinking About You" (Whitney Houston song), 1985
 "Thinking About You" (Ivy song), 2005
 "Thinking About You" (Norah Jones song), 2006
 "Thinking About You" (Calvin Harris song), 2013
 "Thinking About You" (Axwell & Ingrosso song), 2016
 "Thinking About You" (Hardwell and Jay Sean song), 2016
 "Thinking About You", a song by Radiohead from Pablo Honey, 1993
 "Thinking About You", a song by Screaming Jets from Scam, 2000

 "Thinking 'Bout You", a song by Yusuf from the album Roadsinger, 2009
 "Thinking 'Bout You", a song by Lil Wayne from the album Free Weezy, 2015
 "Thinking 'Bout You", a song by Ariana Grande from the album Dangerous Woman, 2016
 "Thinking 'Bout You" (Dua Lipa song), 2017
 "Thinking 'Bout You", a song by Dustin Lynch and Lauren Alaina from the album Tullahoma, 2020

 "Thinkin' About You" (Trisha Yearwood song), 1995
 "Thinkin' About You" (Mario song), 2009
 "Thinkin' About You", a song by Britney Spears from the album ...Baby One More Time, 1999
 "Thinkin' About You", a song by Solange from the album Solo Star, 2002
 "Thinkin' About Ya", a song by Timex Social Club from the album Vicious Rumors, 1986

 "Thinkin Bout You" (Frank Ocean song), 2012
 "Thinkin Bout You" (Ciara song), 2019

 "Thinking About Ya", a song by Colby O'Donis from Colby O, 2008
 "Mone Kori (Thinking About You)", a song by Mumzy Stranger, 2008
 "I've Been Thinking About You", a song by Londonbeat, 1990
 "I've Been Thinking About You" (Mariah Carey song), 1993

See also
 Think About You (disambiguation)
 Thinking of You (disambiguation)